René "Bobo" Botteron (born 17 October 1954, in Glarus) is a Swiss former football midfielder who played for various clubs in Switzerland, Germany and Belgium throughout the 1970s and 1980s.

Career
Botteron started his professional career at FC Zürich in 1972 and won three League Titles and three Swiss Cups before he left in 1980 to join the 1. FC Köln side of the early 1980s, where he played alongside the likes of Dieter Müller, Bernd Schuster, Tony Woodcock, Rainer Bonhof, Bernhard Cullmann, Klaus Fischer, Klaus Allofs and Stephan Engels. He had a short spell at Standard Liège in 1982, where he helped the side reach the final of the UEFA Cup Winners' Cup only to be defeated by FC Barcelona, before signing for 1. FC Nürnberg. In 1983, he returned to Switzerland with FC Basel and retired in 1987 following the club's relegation to the Nationalliga B.

He also played for the Swiss national team and picked up 65 caps between 1974 and 1982, but never played at any major tournaments.

Honours
FC Zürich
 Swiss League: 1973–74, 1974–75, 1975–76
 Swiss Cup: 1971–72, 1972–73, 1975–76

1.FC Köln 
 Bundesliga Runners-Up: 1981–82
 DFB-Pokal Runners-Up: 1979–80
 Joan Gamper Trophy: 1981

Standard Liège
Belgian First Division: 1981–82
European Cup Winners' Cup: 1981-82 (runners-up)

FC Basel
 Uhrencup: 1983, 1986

References

External links
 

1954 births
Living people
Swiss men's footballers
Swiss expatriate footballers
Switzerland international footballers
FC Zürich players
1. FC Köln players
Standard Liège players
1. FC Nürnberg players
FC Basel players
Belgian Pro League players
Bundesliga players
Association football midfielders
Expatriate footballers in Belgium
Expatriate footballers in Germany
Swiss expatriate sportspeople in Belgium
Swiss expatriate sportspeople in Germany
People from Glarus